Sialkot International Airport  is situated 14 km (8.7 mi) west of Sialkot in the Sialkot District of Pakistan. It has the distinction of being the first privately owned  airport in Pakistan. It was built by the business community of Sialkot. Before the completion of the new green field Islamabad International Airport, it also had the longest runway in Pakistan.

Approximately 1,000,000 travelers from Sialkot and adjacent areas are expected to benefit from this international airport each year.

Structure

Sialkot is a major export hub of Pakistan. The airport is being upgraded to make it compatible to carry the load of ten Boeing 747s or A340s. The airport authority is currently working with a private company to develop the airport to meet international standards. The airport has developed a new runway so heavier aircraft can land. There is a new terminal currently being built to deal with an increase in passengers as well as cargo imports and exports.

The airport provides services of fuel farms, aircraft ground maintenance services, catering and other related services through concessions to private parties.

The runway is 3,600-metres long, and 45-metres wide with 7.5-metre wide shoulders on either side corresponding to International Civil Aviation Organisation Category 4E.

The link taxiway is 263-metres long, and 23-metres wide with 10.5-metre shoulders.

It has aprons for passenger and cargo, 95,000-sq metre area. It is a combination of flexible and rigid pavements and also for nose-in parking for 7 wide bodied aircraft plus 4 ATR-42 aircraft at a time.

Two passenger boarding bridges have also become operational.

Airlines and destinations

Cargo

Transport links

Road
Travelers by car from Sialkot reach the airport by travelling west on the Sialkot-Wazirabad Dual Carriageway, turning right at Sambrial to Airport Road and then going straight for 5 km to reach the airport. From Gujranwala, airport visitors take Sialkot Road up to Daska and then go to Sambrial Road. After reaching Sambrial, visitors turn right and go straight on the  Sialkot-Wazirabad Dual Carriageway. After crossing the Sialkot Dry Port, they then turn left on the Airport road. People coming from Gujranwala can also reach the airport through Wazirabad by using the Sialkot-Wazirabad Dual Carriageway. From Gujrat they can take the GT road to Wazirabad, turn left onto Sialkot- Wazirabad road and go all the way to the connection of Airport road on the left which leads to Sialkot airport.

Bus
The airport can be reached from Sialkot up to Sambrial by bus. After that, one has to take a taxi. There is an air-conditioned CNG bus service from the airport to Sialkot, Wazirabad, Daska, and Gujranwala.

Train

Extension of Apron

In 2013, it was confirmed that the airport will be developed further; the apron will be extended to accommodate 12 aircraft and jet bridges, for which construction is already underway.

Extension of the apron enabled the airport to accommodate more aircraft. The project started on 2 October 2010 and was completed on 30 November 2011, incurring a total cost of PKR 180 million as quoted by the contractor of the project. The construction project was awarded to Habib Construction Services, which is one of the largest construction companies in Pakistan and has worked on several other mega projects previously.

Extension Statistics

See also
 List of airports in Pakistan
 Sialkot Cantonment Airport
 Sialkot International Airport Limited

References

External links
 
 Official Website of Sialkot International Airport Limited
 

Airports in Punjab, Pakistan
International airports in Pakistan
Buildings and structures in Sialkot
Transport in Sialkot
Tourist attractions in Sialkot
Privately owned airports